Stations of the Crass is the second album by Crass, released in 1979. The record, originally released as a double 12", includes live tracks from a gig recorded at the Pied Bull pub in Islington, London, on 7 August 1979. The first three sides contain the studio tracks and play at 45 rpm, while the final side comprises the live material and plays at 33 rpm. The album's title is not only a pun on the Catholic rite of the Stations of the Cross (such jibes against the religious establishment were typical of Crass), but is also a reference to the graffiti campaign that the band had been conducting around London's underground railway system, the cover artwork depicting a wall at Bond Street tube station that had allegedly been 'decorated' by them. Although the album met mixed critical reception at first, it managed to sell at least 20,000 copies within two weeks.

A remastered edition of the album, complete with new artwork by Gee Vaucher designed specifically for the small size of a CD case, was due to be released in March 2009, but was delayed because of contentions with former members. The remastered 'Crassical Collection' version was eventually released in October 2010, including a 64-page booklet of liner notes by Steve Ignorant and Penny Rimbaud, as well as bonus tracks in the form of the band's 1979 John Peel Session. The live tracks recorded at the Pied Bull are not included on the remastered edition. In 2019, it was re-remastered by Penny Rimbaud at Abbey Road studios and re-released on both LP and CD, with the original cover art and tracklist, including the hidden track and the Pied Bull tracks. The Crassical Collection version was reissued in October 2020, including the Pied Bull concert.

Critical reception
Graham Lock, when writing for New Musical Express, criticized the album in a 1979 review by questioning certain lyrics and the band's overall performance. More recent reception towards the album has been mostly warm, however. Ned Raggett of AllMusic rewarded the album four out of a possible five stars, stating that "Crass creates a unique brand of fierce, inspirational music." In 
a review for the Sleeping Shaman for the 2010 Crassical Collection edition, Ollie Stygall was very favorable of the album and praised its variety in style. Trouser Press, on the other hand, stated that the album's tracks "blur into white noise." Chuck Eddy, in Spin's "Crust Never Sleeps: 8 Anarcho Punk Essentials," wrote that Crass "vary their often incomprehensibly accented extremist rants with just enough dub, art disco, poetry, and scatology to keep things interesting."

Track listing

Personnel
Steve Ignorant - lead vocals
Eve Libertine - lead vocals on tracks 4, 13, 16
Joy De Vivre - voices
Phil Free - lead guitar, backing vocals
N.A. Palmer - rhythm guitar, backing vocals
Pete Wright - bass guitar, lead vocals on tracks 8, 12, 14
Penny Rimbaud - drums, radio
Gee Vaucher - artwork
Mick Duffield - films

References

1979 albums
Crass Records albums
Crass albums